Kitty Green is an Australian film director, editor, producer, and screenwriter. The majority of her projects have been documentaries, while only one has been a narrative driven story. Green produced, directed, wrote, and edited the 2019 film The Assistant.

Early life and education 
Kitty Green attended the Victorian College of the Arts, where she studied film and television. While attending the Victorian College of the Arts, Green made a short film entitled Spilt that was premiered at the Brisbane International Film Festival and screened at festivals internationally, earning a few awards in the process. Soon after her graduation, Green began work at ABC on 'Art Nation' and 'Artscape'. Green also traveled around Europe and described herself as “crashing on couches” during the beginning of her career. She later went to work on a film entitled Van Diemen’s Land in 2009, but only in the camera and electrical department, specifically in charge of stills. A few years later she went on to work on her first documentary Ukraine is Not a Brothel, spending a year in her grandmother's native home, Ukraine. During the filming she was arrested by the KGB and faced what she described as "a ferocious media circus" when the film released.

Her film Ukraine Is Not A Brothel focuses on the Ukrainian feminist movement "Femen". The film won an AACTA award for Best Australian Feature Documentary. She also won an award for her short film The Face of Ukraine: Casting Oksana Baiul for Best Non-Fiction Short Film at the Sundance Film Festival.

Later on in 2017 Green moved to the United States to work on her documentary Casting JonBenét and currently resides there.

Career 

Soon after graduating from the Victorian College of the Arts, Green went on to work at ABC on ‘Art Nation’ and ‘Artscape’ where she shot, edited, and produced documentary content for national broadcast. Later on she worked on Van Diemen's Land (2009) in the camera and electrical department.

Green directed the following documentaries:
 Casting JonBenét (2017),
 Ukraine Is Not a Brothel (2013),
 The Face of Ukraine: Casting Oksana Baiul (2015).
She also helped on the documentary Austin to Boston as an editor in 2014.

Green also directed The Assistant, a film about an assistant in the film industry who is faced with a moral dilemma in relation to the #MeToo movement.

Filmography 
While it is unclear when Green released it, she did make a student film entitled Spilt.

Awards and nominations 
Green did receive a few awards for her student film Spilt but an official list of nominations and awards are not currently available for this film.

Green won an AACTA award for Best Australian Feature Documentary for the documentary film Ukraine Is Not A Brothel.

Green also won Best Non-Fiction Short Film at the Sundance Film Festival in 2015 for the short film The Face of Ukraine: Casting Oksana Baiul.

References

External links
 

1984 births
Living people
Australian women film directors
Australian women screenwriters
Australian documentary film directors
Australian women film editors
Women documentary filmmakers
Australian women film producers
Australian film editors